This is a list of notable Tasmanians, by birth or association.

Arts
Philanthropist - David Walsh 
Actors - Simon Baker, Errol Flynn, Alison Whyte, Jaason Simmons, Rachael Taylor, Chris King, Robert Grubb, Lucky Grills, Essie Davis, Phillip Borsos, Don Sharp, Cleo Massey, Robert Mannion, Toby Leonard Moore, Jessica Green
Director/Actor - Robert Jarman
Choreographers - Graeme Murphy
Composers - Matthew Dewey, Chainmale, Maria Grenfell, Don Kay, Constantine Koukias, Thanapoom Sirichang, Douglas Knehans, Peter Sculthorpe, John Joseph Woods
Musicians - Eileen Joyce, Monique Brumby, Striborg, Psycroptic, Luca Brasi (band), The Bedroom Philosopher, The Innocents, Rob Tognoni, The Paradise Motel, Alan Gogoll, Asta, Ironhawk, Kat Edwards 
Comic artist - Sols (Alan Salisbury), Hannah Gadsby, Luke McGregor
Fictional - Tasmanian Devil
Painters - Geoffrey Dyer, John Glover, Luke Wagner
Photographers - Peter Dombrovskis, Olegas Truchanas
Television - Charles Wooley, Peter Cundall 
Writers - Richard Davey, Richard Flanagan, Peter Conrad, Christopher Koch, Margaret Scott, Nan Chauncy, Bradley Trevor Greive
Fashion designer - Alannah Hill
Engravers - Richard Jarman
Animators - Felix Colgrave

Historic
Martin Bryant, perpetrator of the 1996 Port Arthur Massacre
Alec Campbell, longest surviving war veteran from the Battle of Gallipoli
George Clarke, University of Tasmania's first vice-chancellor May 1890 to May 1898, and chancellor from May 1898 to May 1907
William Field, convict turned businessman
Harold Gatty, navigator and aviation pioneer
John Gellibrand, founder of Legacy Australia
Dorothy Edna Genders, Anglican deaconess, early woman pioneer in church leadership
Jane Franklin early Tasmanian pioneer
Georgina Kermode, suffragette and engineer
Daniel Priest, Australian convict
Ettie Rout, journalist and wartime sexual health campaigner
Fanny Cochrane Smith, Aboriginal Tasmanian
Truganini, Aboriginal Tasmanian

Politics
Federal - Michael Ferguson, Mark Baker, Dick Adams, Lance Barnard, Neal Blewett, Bob Brown, Brian Harradine, Dame Enid Lyons, Joseph Lyons, Michael Hodgman (later a state politician), Ken Wriedt, Kevin Newman, Jocelyn Newman
State - Jim Bacon, Paul Lennon, Eric Reece, Will Hodgman, Michael Field, Ray Groom (previously federal), Robin Gray, Doug Lowe, Bill Neilson
Other - Andrew Inglis Clark, Richard Jones

Sport
Association football - Alex Cisak
Athletics - Stewart McSweyn
Australian rules football - Matthew Richardson, Alistair Lynch, Darrel Baldock, Ian Stewart, Peter Hudson, Laurie Nash, Paul Williams, Roy Cazaly, Steven Febey, Nick Riewoldt, Jack Riewoldt,  Russell Robertson, Brad Green, Daryn Cresswell, Rodney Eade, Royce Hart, James Manson, Viv Valentine, Verdun Howell, John Klug, Andrew Phillips, Doug Barwick
Chess - Ian Rogers
Cricket - David Boon, Ricky Ponting, Max Walker, Ben Hilfenhaus, Tim Paine, Ted McDonald, George Bailey, Xavier Doherty, Lily Poulett-Harris
Cycling - Richie Porte, Amy Cure 
Motor racing -  Marcos Ambrose, John Bowe
Netball - Natasha Chokljat
Rowing - George Quinlan Roberts
Sailing - Laura Roper
Swimming - Ariarne Titmus
Tennis - Richard Fromberg
Other - David Foster (woodchopping)

Science
Elizabeth Blackburn, first woman from Australia to win a Nobel Prize
Bill Mollison
Frank Styant Browne (1854-1938), X-ray pioneer, first in Tasmania to produce X-rays

Recent notables
Phillip Aspinall, Anglican Archbishop of Brisbane and Primate of Australia
Regina Bird, winner of Big Brother Australia 2003
Mary, Crown Princess of Denmark
Mathew Goggin, professional Tasmanian golfer on US PGA Tour
Tim Lane, journalist and sports commentator
Eric Philips, OAM, polar adventurer and guide
Grace Tame, 2021 Australian of the Year, activist and advocate for the prevention of child sexual assault, founder of The Grace Tame Foundation, motivational speaker,  artist, yoga teacher